Chlorolobion is a genus of algae belonging to the family Selenastraceae.

The species of this genus are found in Europe and America.

Species:

Chlorolobion braunii 
Chlorolobion lunulatum

References

Sphaeropleales
Sphaeropleales genera